Daedalus Books is a seller of books, music, and video founded in 1980. While it also sells new titles, Daedalus Books' specialty is the remaindered book. Its philosophy is to keep bestsellers, classics, and overlooked gems available to the reading public. It sells its products via catalogs and a website.

Although initially a wholesale endeavor, the company over the years grew a retail division that ultimately brought in roughly 60% of annual revenue. In 2018, upon the retirement of Daedalus' founder, Robert (Robin) Moody, the wholesale division of the company shut down. In February of that year, the company sold its retail catalog and online operations to Universal Screen Arts.

Daedalus Books had an outlet store at the front of its  warehouse located in Columbia, Maryland, both of which closed in 2018. In 2006, it opened a store in Belvedere Square, Baltimore. However, in 2011, this branch also closed.

References

External links
 Daedalus Books, official website

1980 establishments in Maryland
Book selling websites
Independent bookstores of the United States